Algeria participated at the 2018 Summer Youth Olympics in Buenos Aires, Argentina from 6 October to 18 October 2018.

Medalists

Mixed NOC

Athletics

Badminton

Algeria qualified one player based on the Badminton Junior World Rankings. 

Team

Boxing

Boys

Girls

Fencing

Algeria qualified two athletes based on its performance at the 2018 Cadet World Championship.

Gymnastics

Artistic
Algeria qualified one gymnast based on its performance at the 2018 African Junior Championship, however they did not participate in the competition.

Trampoline
Algeria qualified one gymnast based on its performance at the 2018 African Junior Championship.

Multidiscipline

Judo

Algeria qualified two competitors based on the International Judo Federation World ranking list.

Boys

Girls

Mixed team

Rowing

Algeria qualified 3 competitors (1 male and 2 female) for the games.

Boys

Girls

Sailing

Algeria qualified two boats based on its performance at the African Techno 293+ Youth Olympic Games Qualifier.

Boys

Girls

Swimming

Algeria qualified 3 competitors in swimming for the games.

Boys

Girls

Weightlifting

Algiera qualified two athletes based on its performance at the 2018 African Youth Championships.

Wrestling

Algeria qualified three wrestlers based on its performance at the 2018 African Cadet Championships. 

Boys' freestyle

Boys' Greco-Roman

References

2018 in Algerian sport
Nations at the 2018 Summer Youth Olympics
Algeria at the Youth Olympics